Chlamys varia, also called Mimachlamys varia common name the variegated scallop, is a species of small scallop, a marine bivalve mollusk in the  family Pectinidae, the scallops. It occurs in the North Sea, the English Channel, the northeastern Atlantic Ocean and the Red Sea.

Shell description
The shell of Chlamys varia comes in a range of colours and variegated patterns including white, pink, red, orange, yellow, or purple, and anything in between. Both valves are convex, rounded or oval, and symmetrical except for the ears on either side of the umbo. They are solid, inequivalve and inequilateral. They have 25 to 35 ribs radiating from the umbo bearing spatulate spines, which are more apparent near the margin. The valves are sculpted by fine concentric lines which show the annual growth rings. The anterior ear is considerably longer than the posterior ear. The right anterior ear has a notch to accommodate the byssus, which anchors the shell in place, and small teeth on the lower edge. The interior surface of the shell is glossy and is often the same colour as the exterior. The shell does not usually exceed  in length.

Distribution and habitat

This species of scallop lives in the North Sea, the English Channel, the Atlantic Ocean, and the Red Sea.
Chlamys varia is a shallow-living species, living up to about 100m in depth along coastal rocky areas. It typically lives under boulders or among the holdfasts of seaweeds. This species is found in sheltered habitats in Strangford Lough in Northern Ireland, and because of its rapid decline there, it is listed as a Northern Ireland Priority Species.

Ecology
Like other scallops, this species is a filter feeder, drawing water through its gills and removing the edible fragments. It changes sex several times during the course of its development, becoming a male when fully mature. It is attached by byssus threads when young but may be detached when older. It is often overgrown by the holdfasts of the seaweeds among which it lives, and sponges such as Halichondria panicea may also grow over the shell.

Gallery

References

Molluscs described in 1758
Taxa named by Carl Linnaeus
varia